In logic, conditioned disjunction (sometimes called conditional disjunction) is a ternary logical connective introduced by Church. Given operands p, q, and r, which represent truth-valued propositions, the meaning of the conditioned disjunction  is given by:

In words,  is equivalent to: "if q then p, else r", or "p or r, according as q or not q". This may also be stated as "q implies p, and not q implies r".

The conditioned disjunction is also equivalent to:

and has the same truth table as the ternary conditional operator ?: in many programming languages. In electronic logic terms, it may also be viewed as a single-bit multiplexer.

In conjunction with truth constants denoting each truth-value, conditioned disjunction is truth-functionally complete for classical logic. Its truth table is the following:

There are other truth-functionally complete  ternary connectives.

References

External links

Logical connectives
Ternary operations